Aden Charmkeh (born May 26, 1984) is a Djiboutian football player who currently plays for no club, and the Djibouti National Football Team. Playing at defender, Charamkeh made the national team under 25 years of age.

International career
Charmakeh is a new addition to the Djiboutian football team. He has started 2 games, and got one yellow card, but no goals.

References 
 FIFA Updates on him, FIFAtm, Copyright 2010, Retrieved on May 3, 2010

1984 births
Living people
Djibouti international footballers
AS Port players
Place of birth missing (living people)
Association football defenders
Djiboutian footballers
Djibouti Premier League players